John Anthony Bird, Baron Bird,  (born 30 January 1946) is a British social entrepreneur and life peer. He is best known as the co-founder of The Big Issue, a magazine that is edited by professional journalists and sold by street vendors who are homeless or vulnerably-housed. Bird sits as an independent Crossbencher member of the House of Lords.

Early life
Bird was born in a Notting Hill slum to a poor London Irish family. He became homeless at the age of five, resided in an orphanage between the ages of seven and ten, and was often excluded from school.

He became a butcher's boy after leaving the orphanage, and supplemented his income by stealing. Between work, he spent several spells in prison during his teens and twenties where he learnt to read, write and the basics of printing.

Bird attended Chelsea School of Art, but was homeless again by 1967, sleeping rough in Edinburgh while being sought by the police for petty offences. In the early 1970s, he started to build upon his prison education and set up a small-scale printing and publishing business in London.

For two weeks in 1970, he worked as a dishwasher in the Houses of Parliament canteen, an institution he would later return to as a life peer.

The Big Issue and work with the homeless
In September 1991, Bird launched The Big Issue with Gordon Roddick, co-founder of The Body Shop. In November 1995, he launched The Big Issue Foundation to further support vendors of The Big Issue.

He is currently on the Board of Directors for The Big Issue Group, which incorporates The Big Issue, Big Issue Invest (its social investment arm) and The Big Issue Foundation.

The Big Issue magazine started as a London venture but expanded with specific editions and services to other British cities, and then to other countries. Bird is also the founder of the International Network of Street Papers, which now incorporates over 100 street papers, and is published in 34 countries in 24 languages.

In 2001, with The Big Issue Group chairman, Nigel Kershaw OBE, Bird founded Big Issue Invest, a provider of finance for businesses, charities and NGOs with the aim of creating positive social change.

It is the social investment arm of The Big Issue Group, and initially only dealt in loan finance. In 2009, Big Issue Invest launched a social investment fund, and has since invested more than £30 million in hundreds of social enterprises making a positive impact in communities across the UK.

Political work
Bird was a member of the Workers Revolutionary Party in the 1970s.

In March 2007, Bird announced his intention to stand for election to the post of Mayor of London as an independent candidate. In May 2007, he unveiled his election manifesto for the 2008 poll, but in October of that year, Bird announced that he had decided not to stand and was instead going to launch a movement "to try and do what the CND did over the bomb, but over social injustice". In November 2016, Bird suggested that he had been asked to stand as the Conservative Party candidate in 2007 - in place of the eventual winner and later Prime Minister Boris Johnson - but turned the offer down.

Bird was a Social Enterprise Ambassador, a scheme was run by Social Enterprise Coalition to promote awareness of social enterprise - a business model used to address a social or environmental needs. The programme was supported by the Office of the Third Sector, part of the UK Government Cabinet Office, and ran between 2007 and 2010.

Bird revealed in 2010 that "my secret is that I'm really a working class Tory. I'd love to be a liberal because they're the nice people, but it's really hard work. I can't swallow their gullibility. I know this may destroy my reputation among middle-class liberals, but wearing the corsetry of liberalism means that every now and then you have to take it off." He has since stated that he has "been hurt by the left, and helped by the left. Just like I've been helped by the right and hurt by the right."

Bird was nominated for life peerage by the House of Lords Appointments Commission in October 2015 to become a non-party-political "people's peer". On 30 October, he was created Baron Bird, of Notting Hill in the Royal Borough of Kensington and Chelsea, sitting as a Crossbencher. In his maiden speech he stated:

Bird's work is non-partisan and focuses on dismantling the root causes of poverty in the UK, with an emphasis on the well-being of future generations, early intervention and prevention. In the House, he also speaks on social enterprise, social mobility, literacy and the Arts.

He co-chairs the All-Party Parliamentary Groups on Future Generations and Libraries, and is vice-chair of the Groups on Poverty, Ending Homelessness and Social Enterprise. He leads debates on poverty, literacy and social business, and is a member of the Lord Speaker's Advisory Panel on Works of Art.

Bird is currently working to promote his private member's bill, the Well-being of Future Generations Bill, as part of a cross-party campaign, 'Today For Tomorrow'.

Awards and recognition
Bird was appointed a Member of the Order of the British Empire (MBE) for "services to homeless people" in the 1995 Birthday Honours; and in 2006, he received the Beacon Fellowship Prize for his originality in raising awareness of homelessness and his support of homeless communities worldwide.

He accepted the UN-HABITAT Scroll of Honour in 2004 from Mwai Kibaki, President of Kenya (2002–2013) on behalf of The Big Issue.

He is currently a Visiting Professor in the School of Journalism at the University of Lincoln and holds an honorary doctorate of business from Plymouth University and an honorary doctorate of letters from Oxford Brookes University. He is an honorary fellow at Liverpool John Moores University and Goldsmiths, University of London.

Bird was the British Society of Magazine Editors Editors’ Editor of the Year in 1993 and was awarded The Revd. Marcus Morris Award from the Professional Publishers Association in 2000. In 2018, Bird was also inducted into the Professional Publishers Association hall of fame.

In 2008, Bird was named Entrepreneur of the Year by Ernst & Young. In 2015, he became a senior fellow of Ashoka and in 2017 he became a fellow of Social Enterprise UK.

References

External links
 Bird's UK Parliament profile 
 Bird's columns in The Big Issue
 

1946 births
English people of Irish descent
Living people
People's peers
Crossbench life peers
Street newspaper people
Members of the Order of the British Empire
Homelessness activists
Life peers created by Elizabeth II